Pyandzh or Pyandj or Panj may refer to:
 Panj, a city in southern Tajikistan, formerly known as Baumanabad and Kirovabad.  
 Panj River, a river between Tajikistan and Afghanistan